Claude Gauthier (born 1939) is a Monegasque painter.

Early life
Claude Gauthier was born in 1939 in Neuilly-sur-Seine, France.

Career
Gauthier began painting in 1965. His artwork is in the permanent collection of the Musée international d'Art naïf Anatole Jakovsky in Nice, France. His work was exhibited in Milan, Italy in September 2015. A year later, it was exhibited at the Jardin Exotique de Monaco in June–July 2016.

Honours 
 2011 : Officer of the Order of Cultural Merit.

References

Living people
1939 births
People from Neuilly-sur-Seine
Monegasque painters
20th-century painters
21st-century painters
Male painters
Officers of the Order of Cultural Merit (Monaco)